Seppo Antero Simola (27 July 1936 in Somero - 9 March 2003) was a Finnish shot putter, who represented Turun Riento, weighing in at 128 kg and standing 191 cm tall. He competed in the men's shot put at the 1972 Summer Olympics.

He was the first Finn to put the shot more than 20 m in an official competition when he put it 20.15 metres in Turku, Finland on 19 July 1972; this was of course his personal best and a national record. Even though Simola was a five-time Finnish champion outdoors and three-time champion indoors, he never placed higher than 16th in the Olympics and 11th in the European Championships.

Simola was one of the first six Finns originally admitted to the 20 meter club when it was founded in April 1983.

Major achievements

References

1936 births
2003 deaths
People from Somero
Finnish male shot putters
Athletes (track and field) at the 1972 Summer Olympics
Olympic athletes of Finland
Sportspeople from Southwest Finland
20th-century Finnish people
21st-century Finnish people